Ding-Zhu Du (born May 21, 1948) is a Professor in the Department of Computer Science at The University of Texas at Dallas. He has received public recognition when he solved two long-standing open problems on the Euclidean minimum Steiner trees, the proof of Gilbert–Pollack conjecture on the Steiner ratio of the Euclidean plane, and the existence of a polynomial-time heuristic with a performance ratio bigger than the Steiner ratio. The proof of Gilbert-Pollak's conjecture on Steiner ratios was later found to have gaps, thus leaving the problem unsolved.

Education 
Ding-Zhu Du received his M.Sc in Operations Research from the Chinese Academy of Sciences in 1985. He received his Ph.D. in Mathematics with research area in Theoretical Computer Science from the University of California, Santa Barbara in 1984.

Career 
Early in his career he solved two long-standing open problems on the Euclidean minimum Steiner trees, the proof of Gilbert-Pollak's conjecture on the Steiner ratio, and the existence of a polynomial-time heuristic with a performance ratio bigger than the Steiner ratio.

He was Program Director for CISE/CCF, National Science Foundation, USA, 2002-2005, Professor, Department of Computer Science, University of Minnesota, 1991-2005. and Assistant Professor, Department of Mathematics, Massachusetts Institute of Technology, 1986-1987.

He has been active in research on Design and Analysis of Approximation Algorithm for 30 years. And over these years he has published 177 Journal articles, 60 conference and workshop papers, 22 editorship, 9 reference works and 11 informal publications.

Books published 
 Theory of Computational Complexity.
 Problem Solving in Automata, Languages, and Complexity.
 Pooling Designs and Nonadaptive Group Testing.
 Mathematical Theory of Optimization.
 Combinatorial Group Testing and Its Applications (2nd Edition).
 Connected Dominating Set: Theory and Applications.
 Design and Analysis of Approximation Algorithms.
 Steiner Tree Problems In Computer Communication Networks.

Awards and honors 
 2007 Received the Best Paper Award from International Conference on Wireless Algorithms, Systems and Applications (WASA’07), Chicago, Illinois, USA
 2009-2014 Honorary Dean of Science, Xi’an Jiaotong University
 2003 Received the Best Paper Award from the 22nd IEEE International Performance, Computing, and Communication Conference at Phoenix, Arizona, USA, April 9–11.
 1998 Received CSTS Prize from INFORMS (a merge of American Operations Research Society and Institute of Management Science) for research excellence in the interface between Operations Research and Computer Science
 1996 Received the 2nd Class National Natural Science Prize in China.
 1993 Received the 1st Class Natural Science Prize from Chinese Academy of Sciences.
 1992 Received the National Young Scientist Prize from China
 1990-1991 The proof of Gilbert–Pollak conjecture was reported in The New York Times.
 1989 Received the 1st Class Young Scientist Prize from Chinese Academy of Sciences, Beijing, China.
 1988 Received the 3rd Class National Natural Science Prize in China.

References 

1948 births
Living people
University of Texas at Dallas faculty
University of California, Santa Barbara alumni
Chinese emigrants to the United States
Chinese computer scientists
American computer scientists